Alan Gordon is a Canadian actor. He appeared in films such as Foxy Lady (1971), in which he falls for actress Sylvia Feigel, Cannibal Girls (1973), and Easy Money (1983).

Gordon also appeared on such television series as Law & Order.

References

External links

Canadian male film actors
Canadian male television actors
20th-century Canadian male actors
Living people
Place of birth missing (living people)
Year of birth missing (living people)